Stefanie McLeod "Stef" Reid  (born 26 October 1984) is a track and field paralympian who competes for Great Britain, competing mainly in category T44 long jump and sprint events. A multiple medal winner at European and world level, she won a bronze medal in the 200m at the 2008 Summer Paralympics and silver in the long jump at the 2012 Summer Paralympics.

Reid was also a semi-finalist on Celebrity MasterChef in 2018 and was a quarter-finalist on the fourteenth series of Dancing on Ice.

Personal history
Reid was born in New Zealand to British parents; her father is Scottish and her mother is English. The family moved to Toronto, Ontario, Canada when she was aged 4. Reid lost her right foot in a boating accident, aged 16. Her life was saved by a surgeon in Toronto who amputated her right leg below the knee.

Reid is married to Canadian wheelchair racer Brent Lakatos, and they now live in England where they both train at Loughborough University. Reid is a Christian.

Athletics career
Sports-loving before the accident, she played rugby union, but encountered difficulties after her amputation with referees who felt the artificial leg could injure other players. Deciding to concentrate on her studies, she gained a full scholarship to Queen's University to study biochemistry. After joining the campus track and field team, three years later she competed at the World Championships.

Competing for Canada in the 2008 Summer Paralympics in Beijing, China, she won a bronze medal in the women's 200 metres - T44 event, went out in the first round of the women's 100 metres - T44 event and finished fifth in the women's Long jump - F44 event. She switched allegiance to Great Britain at the start of 2010.

In April 2013, it was announced that Reid would feature in the latest campaign for British high-street store Debenhams, the first high street chain to use disabled models in its campaigns. Reid's photo was featured in British Vogue magazine in April 2013. The imagery celebrates diversity in the retail sector.

Reid attempted to qualify to represent Scotland in the main long jump competition at the 2014 Commonwealth Games. She did not meet the qualifying standard of 6.2 metres, although she set a world record for the T44 class at the Sainsbury's Glasgow Grand Prix (5.47m) whilst attempting to qualify.

She was appointed Member of the Order of the British Empire (MBE) in the 2018 New Year Honours for services to Paralympic sport.

References

External links
 
 
 
 

1984 births
Living people
Queen's University at Kingston alumni
Canadian female sprinters
Canadian female long jumpers
British female sprinters
British female long jumpers
Paralympic athletes of Great Britain
Paralympic track and field athletes of Canada
Paralympic silver medalists for Great Britain
Paralympic bronze medalists for Canada
Athletes (track and field) at the 2008 Summer Paralympics
Athletes (track and field) at the 2012 Summer Paralympics
Athletes (track and field) at the 2016 Summer Paralympics
Medalists at the 2008 Summer Paralympics
Medalists at the 2012 Summer Paralympics
Medalists at the 2016 Summer Paralympics
British expatriates in the United States
Canadian expatriates in the United States
Anglo-Scots
Canadian people of English descent
Canadian people of Scottish descent
Models with disabilities
Scottish Paralympic competitors
British amputees
Canadian amputees
Canadian expatriate sportspeople in England
Canadian people of New Zealand descent
New Zealand emigrants to Canada
Members of the Order of the British Empire
Paralympic medalists in athletics (track and field)
Medalists at the 2007 Parapan American Games
Medalists at the World Para Athletics Championships
Medalists at the World Para Athletics European Championships
Athletes (track and field) at the 2020 Summer Paralympics
English Christians
Canadian Christians
Television presenters with disabilities